Ardozyga annularia is a species of moth in the family Gelechiidae. It was described by Turner in 1919. It is found in Australia, where it has been recorded from southern Queensland.

References

Ardozyga
Moths described in 1919
Moths of Australia